Segestidea montana is a species of insect in the family Tettigoniidae.

References

Tettigoniinae
Insects described in 1979